The Elton United Methodist Church is a historic church located at 803 2nd Street in Elton in Jefferson Davis Parish, Louisiana.

Built in 1911, it is a wood frame Gothic Revival-style church, and is a rare example of that in the parish.  It has a bell tower at its entrance.  Its windows have muntins making simple patterns. Despite a largish addition to the rear in the 1950s or 1960s that detracts somewhat from the architectural character of the building, the church overall integrity remains intact.

The church was added to the National Register of Historic Places on September 30, 1994.

See also
 National Register of Historic Places listings in Jefferson Davis Parish, Louisiana

References

United Methodist churches in Louisiana
Churches on the National Register of Historic Places in Louisiana
Carpenter Gothic church buildings in Louisiana
Churches completed in 1911
Buildings and structures in Jefferson Davis Parish, Louisiana
National Register of Historic Places in Jefferson Davis Parish, Louisiana